Study Group is a for-profit education provider that prepares international students for university degree programmes and offers English language courses.

The company operates in the United Kingdom. Study Group also operates International Study Centres in several universities within the UK and other European countries, the United States, Australia and New Zealand. Its headquarters are located in London, UK while it also maintains offices in Asia, Australasia, Europe, North America and South America.

History

Previously acquired by businessmen Andrew Colin and Duncan Greenland in 1989, the company dates the origin of Study Group as British Study Group, with centres in Hastings and Brighton, England. A second language school was opened in Hove shortly after.  Colin had previously acquired Bellerbys College, a sixth-form college for international students and was later incorporated in 1994 by Andrew Colin and Duncan Greenland, adding a third shareholder/director John Collyer with the merger.

For its initial offerings in the United Kingdom, Study Group's international students on pathway programmes were taught at an "International Study Centre" in partner university premises before starting their degree courses. As of 2021, it also offers its own online pathway programme.

In 1996, 40% of the business was acquired by the Daily Mail Group, becoming Study Group International. The same year, it expanded to the US and Australia.  In 1999, the Daily Mail Group paid an estimated GB£44 million. to take over 100% ownership of Study Group. The company is now known as Study Group.

As part of its expansion the UK and Australian operations, Study Group acquired the Center for English Studies (CES) chain of language schools in the US and Canada, adding Boston, Fort Lauderdale, Los Angeles, New York, San Diego, San Francisco, Seattle and Vancouver to its fold. It was later renamed to Embassy CES, and then Embassy English. In November 2018, Embassy English was acquired by EC.

In 2006 Study Group was acquired by Australian private equity company CHAMP, having been sold by Daily Mail Group for A$176.4 million.

In 2007, the Brighton school and UK head office moved to purpose-built premises in the New England Quarter, next to Brighton station, costing an estimated GB£28 million.
	
On July 1, 2010, Providence Equity Partners took ownership of Study Group for $660 million Australian dollars.

In February 2019, Ardian, a private investment house, announced that it had acquired a majority stake in Study Group.

In February 2020, Study Group acquired the learning experience platform insendi to help develop its online pathway programme offering.

In September 2022, Study Group decided to close Bellerbys College.

Taylors College

Established in 1920, Taylors College is a university preparation college providing university foundation, diploma and Australian High School programmes (Year 10 - Year 12) in Australia and New Zealand. It was acquired by Study Group in 1998.

Taylors College had three locations in major cities of Australia and New Zealand: Perth, Sydney, and Auckland. Taylors College Perth is now closed.

Charles Sturt University Study Centres (Australia)

Charles Sturt University is an Australian multi-campus public university located in New South Wales, Queensland, Victoria, and the Australian Capital Territory.

Charles Sturt University Study Centres are operated in conjunction with Study Group Australia, offering undergraduate and postgraduate degrees in Accounting, Business and Information Technology. The Study Centres have two campuses located in the city centres of Brisbane, Melbourne, Sydney, Australia. In September 2021 it was announced that the centres would be closed at the end of 2022, and that the agreement between the University and Study Group would not be extended.

References

External links
 

Language schools
Multinational companies
International business
Education companies of the United Kingdom